The Lovetown Tour was a concert tour by the Irish rock band U2, which took place in late 1989 and early 1990 following the release of Rattle and Hum.  It was documented by noted rock film director Richard Lowenstein in the "LoveTown" documentary.

Itinerary
While the tour was limited in scope, it reached places that The Joshua Tree Tour had missed, all the while avoiding the United States entirely.

The tour's opening night was on 21 September 1989 at the Entertainment Centre in Perth, Australia.  The first leg took place over the next 10 weeks in Australia, New Zealand, and Japan.  A brief second leg hit four countries in Europe for four weeks, ending on 10 January 1990 at the Sport Paleis Ahoy in Rotterdam, Netherlands.  Of the tour's 47 concerts, 23 were played in Australia.

Show overview
Songs played on the tour largely coincided with those played on The Joshua Tree Tour, also including then-new songs from Rattle and Hum including a nightly cover of Bob Dylan's All Along the Watchtower in a version obviously influenced by that of Jimi Hendrix.  The band, however, delighted fans by sometimes shifting its setlist from night to night and with uncharacteristic guitar soloing by The Edge.  Many songs performed on the tour would not be performed again for many years, if ever, as the band subsequently shifted its sound dramatically on the album Achtung Baby with tours in the 1990s that featured more choreographed performances and largely emphasized newer material.  The tour marked the end of the band's long-time practice of concluding nearly every concert with the song "40", which featured the band leaving the stage one-by-one and the audience chanting the chorus.  This practice was not resurrected until 15 years later, during the Vertigo Tour.  Notably absent from the tour was the song Sunday Bloody Sunday, which had been a live staple and which would be featured in all subsequent tours.  Other songs performed included "Slow Dancing" and "She's a Mystery to Me", written for Willie Nelson and Roy Orbison, respectively.  Both artists would go on to record the respective songs, with Orbison's recording being featured on his final, posthumously released album, Mystery Girl, which was named for the song. B. B. King toured with the band and played the first set each night. At the end of U2's set, King and his band joined them for a short encore.

The tour was plagued by troubles with Bono's voice due to both excessive use and illness - he stated in concert that he caught "some pretty psychedelic germs" in Australia and that they were "having their Annual General Meeting" in his throat.  These vocal troubles meant three Sydney concerts had to be postponed. Later, severe troubles meant concerts in Dortmund and Amsterdam had to prematurely conclude; two other Amsterdam shows were cancelled and replaced by four shows in Rotterdam, causing the tour to spill over into 1990 instead of ending on New Year's Eve at Dublin's Point Depot as planned.  However, when Bono's voice was not troubling him, he had an impressive singing range, with the falsetto later mastered starting to seriously appear, but without sacrificing the powerful depth of his lower singing range.

As with all U2 tours from 1983 on, the stage and lighting design was done by Willie Williams.

Average setlist 
This set list is representative of the tour's average setlist as conducted by Setlist.fm, which represents all concerts for the duration of the tour.

 "Where the Streets Have No Name"
 "I Will Follow"
 "I Still Haven't Found What I'm Looking For"
 "Desire"
 "MLK"
 "All Along the Watchtower" (Bob Dylan cover)
 "All I Want is You"
 "God Part II"
 "Bullet the Blue Sky"
 "Bad"
 "Van Diemen's Land"
 "Running to Stand Still"
 "New Year's Day"
 "Pride (In the Name of Love)"

 Encore

 "Angel of Harlem"
 "With or Without You"
 "When Love Comes to Town"
 "Love Rescue Me"
 "40"

"LoveTown" documentary
The "LoveTown" documentary featured performances filmed primarily on 18 November 1989 at Sydney Entertainment Centre in Sydney, Australia.  The film opened with "Hawkmoon 269", and featured live renderings of "Desire", "All Along the Watchtower", "MLK", "All I Want Is You", "Van Diemen's Land," "God Part II", "When Love Comes to Town", and "Love Rescue Me".  The documentary was interspersed with interviews with the band members and Sydney locals, as well as a radio performance of an early version of "Slow Dancing," a song Bono wrote for Willie Nelson.

"Dream it all up again"
The 31 December 1989, Dublin concert was broadcast on RTÉ and BBC radio around the world, giving many fans their only taste of the tour; it was widely bootlegged and ultimately officially released in digital form in 2004 as Live from the Point Depot.  It was during the 30 December Dublin show the night before, however, that Bono, apparently dissatisfied with the band's stagnation, famously said:
"I was explaining to people the other night, but I might've got it a bit wrong – this is just the end of something for U2. And that's what we're playing these concerts – and we're throwing a party for ourselves and you. It's no big deal, it's just – we have to go away and ... and dream it all up again."

This foreshadowed the abrupt directional changes the band would take in the 1990s, beginning with Achtung Baby and the Zoo TV Tour.

Tour dates

See also
 Timeline of U2

References
Footnotes

Bibliography

External links
 U2.com
 U2 Tour site on Lovetown Tour

U2 concert tours
1989 concert tours